The RDS-2 (Russian: РДС-2) was the second atomic bomb developed by the Soviet Union as an improved version of the RDS-1. It included new explosive lenses along with a new core design to decrease the probability of pre-detonation or 'fizzle'. The RDS-2 was tested on September 24, 1951 and produced a 38.3 kiloton yield. It was detonated from the top of a tower thirty meters high. The detonation was controlled by a bomber flying over the testing site instead of the detonation being controlled by a ground control center.

See also
Soviet atomic bomb project
RDS-1
RDS-3

Notes

References

Citations

Bibliography 

Nuclear weapons of the Soviet Union
Soviet nuclear weapons testing
Nuclear bombs of the Soviet Union
1951 in the Soviet Union
Nuclear weapons policy
Nuclear proliferation
1951 in military history